Washington's 32nd legislative district is one of forty-nine districts in Washington state for representation in the state legislature.

It includes the cities of Lynnwood, Edmonds (both in Snohomish County) and Shoreline (in King County).

The district's legislators are state senator Jesse Salomon and state representatives Cindy Ryu (position 1) and Lauren Davis (position 2), all Democrats.

See also
Washington Redistricting Commission
Washington State Legislature
Washington State Senate
Washington House of Representatives

References

External links
Washington State Redistricting Commission
Washington House of Representatives
Map of Legislative Districts

32